The 1996 season was the 91st season of competitive football in Norway.

Men's football

League season

Promotion and relegation

Tippeligaen

1. divisjon

Group 1

Group 2

2. divisjon

3. divisjon

Norwegian Cup

Final

Women's football

League season

Toppserien

Norwegian Women's Cup

Final
Trondheims-Ørn 3–0 Klepp

UEFA competitions

UEFA Champions League

Qualifying round

|}

Group stage

Group D

UEFA Cup Winners' Cup

Qualifying round

|}

First round

|}

Second round

|}

Quarter-finals

|}

UEFA Cup

Qualifying round

|}

First round

|}

Intertoto Cup

Group stage

Group 5

National teams

Norway men's national football team

Source:

Results

Norway women's national football team

Results

References

External links
  Norge Menn Senior A, Football Association of Norway 1908–present
 RSSSF.no – National team 1996

 
Seasons in Norwegian football